Antonio Tuivuna (born 20 March 1995) is a Fijian footballer who plays as a midfielder for Labasa.

Career
Tuivana advanced through the youth ranks at Ba, making his senior debut in 2012 at the age of seventeen. After two years with the club, he departed on a free transfer to Suva A season later, Tuivana moved to Nadi before moving back to Ba on a $5,000 FJD transfer. In 2017 he moved to the Labasa, known as the Babasiga Lions.

International career
Tuivuna made his debut for the senior team in November 2015 in a 1-1 draw against Vanuatu. Before this he was a member of the U20's and the U23's. With the U20's he won the 2014 OFC U-20 Championship and qualified for the 2015 FIFA U-20 World Cup. This was the first time that Fiji had qualified for a FIFA World Cup event. Tuivuna played in all three group matches, including in the historical 3-0 victory against Honduras.

International goals
Scores and results list Fiji's goal tally first.

References

External links

 
 

Living people
1995 births
People from Ba Province
Association football defenders
Fiji international footballers
Fijian footballers
Ba F.C. players
Suva F.C. players
Nadi F.C. players
Footballers at the 2016 Summer Olympics
Olympic footballers of Fiji
Dreketi F.C. players